Purbaya Polytechnic Institute, officially Politeknik Purbaya, is a private coeducational vocational education institution located in Tegal Regency, Central Java Province, Indonesia. It is the first technical higher education institution in the regency. Its campus is situated at Jalan Pancakarya No. 1 Talang. The polytechnic is operated autonomously under patronage of Yayasan Pertiwi di Tegal (The Pertiwi in Tegal Foundation).

Purbaya was established in 2002 by Mr H. Soediarto, the Regent of Tegal at the time and his wife Mrs. Hj. Sri Adiyati Soediarto. It was named after Raden Purbayasa, the first Regent of Tegal. The polytechnic's operating permit was issued by Ministry of National Education (now Ministry of Research, Technology and Higher Education) with Minister Decree No. 208/D/O/2002.

The polytechnic currently offers three-year vocational education in Mechanical Engineering and  Information Systems.

Study Programs 
The Purbayatech offers three-years vocational education in: 
Mechanical engineering with a focus in mechanical systems design
Information systems with a focus in free/open-source software  based Information systems

Mechanical Engineering Study Program 
The Mechanical Engineering Study Program is intended to produce middle-level experts who are competent to:   
 Read and create technical/mechanical drawings according to ISO standards
 Create three-dimensional drawings of mechanical systems
 Design mechanical parts or systems
 Compute strength of mechanical system constructions
 Schedule and compute cost of prototype realization
 Use information technology in their work

Information System Study Program 
The Information System Study Program is intended to produce middle-level experts who are competent to:
 Develop application programs based on the LAMP software bundle.
 Administer the Linux operating system
 Design and administer Linux based computer networks
 Implement website content management systems
 Implement e-commerce concepts on small and middle size businesses
 Use office suite: word processor, spreadsheet and presentation

General 

Tegal Regency has a reputation as a center of plate metalworking home industries in Indonesia.

Free/open-source software based education policy
Since January 2007, Purbayatech has implemented free/open-source (FOSS) technology into its academic and administrative activities.

List of FOSS being used:
Algorithm and Data Structure Laboratory :  Java
C compiler : GCC
Technical / Engineering Drawing  : LibreCAD
Numerical computations :  Scilab
Office suite   : LibreOffice
Operating system  : Linux
RDMS : MySQL
Solid modeling : BRL-CAD and FreeCAD
Web browser    : Mozilla Firefox
Web programming   : PHP
Web Server Configuration Training  : Apache

External links
 Official website

Buildings and structures in Central Java
Technical universities and colleges
Colleges in Indonesia
Educational institutions established in 2002
2002 establishments in Indonesia
Education in Central Java
Vocational education